"Un Canadien errant" ("A Wandering Canadian") is a song written in 1842 by Antoine Gérin-Lajoie after the Lower Canada Rebellion of 1837–38. Some of the rebels were condemned to death, others forced into exile to the United States and as far as Australia.  Gérin-Lajoie wrote the song, about the pain of exile, while taking his classical exams at the Séminaire de Nicolet. The song has become a patriotic anthem for certain groups of Canadians who have at a point in their history experienced the pain of exile. In addition to those exiled following the Lower Canada Rebellion, it has come to hold particular importance for the rebels of the Upper Canada Rebellion, and for the Acadians, who suffered mass deportation from their homeland in the Great Upheaval between 1755 and 1763. The Acadian version is known as "Un Acadien errant."

Origins
Accounts of the origins of this song vary. In Souvenirs de collège, Antoine Gérin-Lajoie writes that he based his verse on an existing folk tune: 

In that publication the song was titled "Le Proscrit" and the tune said to be "Au bord d'un clair ruisseau."

The melody is from the French Canadian folk tune "J'ai fait une maîtresse" (of which "Si tu te mets anguille" is also a variation).  The musical form is "AABB" or double-binary, with the A phrase repeated before moving to the B phrase, which is also repeated.  The musical form is reflected in the lyrics as follows:

'A' phrase, with repeat:

'B' phrase, with repeat:

The rise in the tune on the first line of the B phrase is inverted on the repeat (at the point of "en pleurant"), to make the phrase period, and thus provide closure to the AABB form.

Paul Robeson performed a bilingual version under the title "Le Canadien Errant" and recorded it in the 1950s. This version was included in his 1969 East German compilation album Amerikanische Ballade; the album was released posthumously in the United States in 1977 as American Balladeer.

American audiences were introduced to the song in 1963 with French-language performances by Ian & Sylvia. They included "Un Canadien errant" on their debut 1962 album Ian & Sylvia.  They gave it further prominence at the Newport Folk Festival as recorded on the 1996 album Ian & Sylvia Live at Newport.

In the 1969 film, My Side of the Mountain, the folk singer and musicologist Theodore Bikel sang the first part of "Un Canadien Errant" and then played a bit of it on a "homemade" reed flute. The melody refrained throughout the film.

Leonard Cohen recorded "Un Canadien errant" as "The Lost Canadian" on his 1979 Recent Songs album. His own song "The Faith", on his 2004 album Dear Heather, is based on the same melody.

American folk duo John & Mary included an arrangement by Mary Ramsey on their 1991 album Victory Gardens.

Canadian folk rock duo Whitehorse recorded "Un Canadien errant" and included it on their 2013 covers album The Road to Massey Hall. A version performed by the duo is featured on the soundtrack to One Week, a 2008 film starring Joshua Jackson.

The song also made an appearance as the location music for Canada in the Where in the World Is Carmen Sandiego video game (1996), performed by Terry Gadsden & Frederik Kinck-Petersen.

History
Ernest Gagnon in Chansons populaires du Canada (Quebec City 1865) says "the original tune was "J'ai fait une maîtresse," of which the words of the variant "Si tu te mets anguille" are (somewhat altered) fragments.' Gagnon's analysis is considered definitive.

An Acadian variation appeared in 1844 as "Un Acadien Errant", sung to the Gregorian tune "Ave Maris Stella".  Otherwise, to a few (and especially to expatriate Canadians), the original song remains a patriotic song; to all, it is a poignant recollection of French Canadian history.

Original lyrics

Original French lyrics:

English translation

English version

This is the 1927 English version by John Murray Gibbon.  Only the first verse preserves the ABAB rhyme pattern of the original French; thereafter it varies.  Note that the use of the word 'lad' here means a young adult man, as was common in the time period.

References

Notes

Citations

Bibliography

1842 songs
Lower Canada Rebellion
Quebecois patriotic songs
Un Canadien errant
Works about human migration
Canadian patriotic songs